Augusta Victoria Compound is Community hospital and Church complex on the northern side of Mount of Olives in East Jerusalem and one of six hospitals in the East Jerusalem Hospitals Network. The compound was built in 1907–1914 by the Empress Augusta Victoria Foundation as a center for the German Protestant community in Ottoman Palestine, in addition to the slightly older Church of the Redeemer from Jerusalem's Old City. Apart from the hospital, today the complex also includes the German Protestant Church of the Ascension with a c. 50 metre high belltower, a meeting centre for pilgrims and tourists, an interreligious kindergarten and a café, as well as the Jerusalem branch of the German Protestant Institute of Archaeology.

Throughout much of its history, the compound was used first and foremost as a hospital, either by the military (during the First and Second World Wars and during Jordanian rule), or for Palestinian refugees and general public (from 1950 until today), and at times also as a government or military headquarters (1915–1927).

Today, Augusta Victoria Hospital provides specialty care for Palestinians from across the West Bank and the Gaza Strip with services including a cancer center, a dialysis unit, and a pediatric center. It is the second largest hospital in East Jerusalem, as well as the sole remaining specialized care unit located in the West Bank or Gaza Strip.

History

The complex was named for Augusta Viktoria of Schleswig-Holstein, wife of German Kaiser Wilhelm II, who visited Jerusalem in 1898. The architect, Robert Leibnitz, was inspired by German palaces, such as the German Hohenzollern Castle.
The complex was photographed in detail in ca. 1910, along with the inaugural celebrations, by Khalil Raad, Palestine's first Arab photographer. Although officially inaugurated on 10 April 1910, the construction was only finalised in 1914.

After the Kaiser's 1898 visit, he commissioned the construction of a guesthouse for German pilgrims. Private donations were collected throughout Germany and donators honoured with the Cross of the Mount of Olives. Many of the building materials were imported from Germany. A 60-metre high church tower was constructed with four bells, the largest of them weighing six tons. To transport these bells from Jaffa, the road to Jerusalem had to be widened and paved. The expense was more than double the cost of transporting the bells from Hamburg to Jaffa. Augusta Victoria was the first building in the country to have electricity, provided by a diesel generator.

During World War I, the Hospital served as German military hospital. From 1915 to 1917 the compound was used as Ottoman headquarters by Djemal Pasha. From June to December 1917 the hospital was used as headquarters for the German high command of the German expeditionary corps (Asienkorps). After the British conquest, the Augusta Victoria compound served as the headquarters of General Allenby's Egyptian Expeditionary Force and later as the headquarters of the British Military Administration of Occupied Enemy Territory (South).

From 1920 to 1927, Augusta Victoria was the official residence of the British High Commissioner of the Palestine Mandate. In 1927, the buildings were severely damaged in an earthquake and the pointy roof of the belfry was rebuilt by 10 metres shorter. The British headquarters moved to Armon HaNetziv, on the outskirts of Talpiot. In 1928 the compound was returned to its German pre-war owner, the Kaiserin Augusta Victoria Foundation.

The Nazi party held meetings and assemblies at Augusta Victoria under the leadership of Ludwig Buchhalter, a Templer living in the Germany Colony who was appointed head of Jerusalem branch of the Nazi party in 1934. In the mid-1930s, when the building was about to reopen as a hostel run by Deaconesses, the management decided to bar Jewish guests to preserve the institution's Christian character.

During World War II, the compound was again used as a hospital by the British.

Under Jordanian administration, technically under United Nations Truce Supervision Organization control, it was a military hospital for soldiers from the Arab Legion.

After World War II, the entire property of the German Evangelical mission to Palestine was passed into the fiduciary responsibility of the Lutheran World Federation (LWF); in 1950 the LWF established a large hospital for refugees in the compound. The hospital director was the long-time staff physician of the German Deaconess Hospital of Jerusalem, the Arab Palestinian Dr. Tawfiq Canaan, who kept this position until 1956.

Prior to the 1967 Six-Day War, the campus was fortified with several bunkers. During that war the building was heavily damaged, the upper floor was devastated by fire and was only rebuilt in 1988.

Today

Today, August Victoria Hospital provides specialty care for Palestinians from across the West Bank and the Gaza Strip with services including a cancer center, a dialysis unit, and a pediatric center. In 2016, it inaugurated a bone marrow transplantation unit. It is the second-largest hospital in East Jerusalem, as well as being the sole remaining specialized-care hospital located in the West Bank or Gaza Strip. It runs 120 in-patient beds and treat a number of outpatients who come in for dialysis and radiation treatment, being the only facility serving 4.5m Palestinians in the area of radiation therapy.

In May 2016, Joint Commission International, a US-based body that assesses hospitals and health care facilities globally, re-accredited the hospital for another three years.

The hospital is one of six specialized medical centers in the East Jerusalem Hospitals Network, comprising Makassed Islamic Charitable Hospital, Augusta Victoria Hospital, Red Crescent Maternity Hospital, St. John's Eye Hospital, Princess Basma Rehabilitation Centre and St. Joseph's Hospital. They have been the main providers of tertiary referral care for Palestinians in the West Bank and Gaza Strip for health services for which the Ministry of Health is unable to provide, such as cancer care, cardiac and eye surgeries, neonatal intensive care, children's dialysis and physical rehabilitation of children.

Since its establishment in 1950 Auguste Victoria Hospital has been primarily run and financed by The Lutheran World Federation and the United Nations Relief and Works Agency for Palestine Refugees in the Near East (UNRWA). The hospital mission statement includes the provision of health care without regard to race, creed, gender, or national origin.

The hospital currently (2016) has 118 inpatient beds, 52 ambulatory beds and stations, and 403 staff. In 2016 it admitted 12,605 patients, and did 22,716 dialysis sessions, 20,088 chemotherapy sessions and 25,585 radiation sessions.

Compound
The Augusta Victoria compound currently contains the following buildings and institutions:
 Augusta Victoria Hospital
 Church of the Ascension (German Evangelical)
 Evangelical (Protestant) Pilgrims and Meeting Centre (Evangelisches Pilger- und Begegnungszentrum der Kaiserin Auguste Victoria-Stiftung)
 An interreligious kindergarten
 Café Auguste Victoria
 The German Protestant Institute of Archaeology (Deutsches Evangelisches Institut für Altertumswissenschaft des Heiligen Landes), Jerusalem branch (the second one is in Amman)

The rectory of the pastor of the Lutheran Church of the Redeemer is also located on the site, along with administrative offices and living quarters of the Jerusalem offices of The Lutheran World Federation.

The guesthouse is run by The Lutheran World Federation for international volunteers and guests.

Oncology services
The hospital has a Department of Oncology which is an advanced center for cancer treatment. The department consists of the Unit for Medical Oncology, the Unit for Radiation Oncology, and the Unit for Surgical Oncology.

A pediatric oncology ward for Palestinian children opened in April 2005 in a joint project with the Peres Center for Peace, various Italian foundations and the Hadassah University Hospital, which trained the oncologist and nursing staff.

See also
 Patient's Friends Society-Jerusalem

References

External links

Mount of Olives
Hospital buildings completed in 1910
Lutheran churches in Israel
Ascension
Hospitals in Jerusalem
Hospitals established in 1910
Healthcare in the State of Palestine
Lutheran church buildings in the State of Palestine
East Jerusalem Hospitals Network